Jeff Sims (born January 1, 2002) is an American football player. He plays college football for the Nebraska Cornhuskers. He formerly played for the Georgia Tech Yellow Jackets.

Early life and high school career 
Sims played high school football for Sandalwood High School in Jacksonville, Florida from 2016 to 2020. He served as the team's starting quarterback starting in his sophomore year. While initially hoping to play college football for the Miami Hurricanes, the team showed no interest in him, and he instead was drawn towards the Florida State Seminoles under then-head coach Willie Taggart. In February 2019, he committed to Florida State, with the prospect of being a backup quarterback to James Blackman. Later that year, he competed in the Elite 11 quarterback competition. On December 11, following Florida State's firing of Taggart and hiring of Mike Norvell as new head coach, he rescinded his commitment to Florida State, and on December 18, he signed to the Georgia Tech Yellow Jackets. Ultimately, Sims had received over a dozen offers from schools in the NCAA Division I Football Bowl Subdivision, including Florida State, Georgia Tech, and the Maryland Terrapins. 247Sports.com ranked him the No. 10 dual-threat quarterback in the country and the No. 223 recruit overall. In January 2020, he played in the Under Armour All-America Game, a high school football all-star game, where he was part of the winning team.

Sims's uncle, Mike Sims-Walker, is a former football player who played in the National Football League for the Jacksonville Jaguars.

College career

Georgia Tech 
Following the team's 2019 season, quarterback Tobias Oliver was moved to cornerback, leaving that position empty, with Sims, Tucker Gleason, James Graham, and Jordan Yates vying for the position during the offseason. Graham and Sims were considered the strongest candidates for the position, though the team refused to comment prior to the start of the season. On September 11, The Atlanta Journal-Constitution announced that Sims would be the team's starting quarterback. He made his collegiate start on September 12, leading the Yellow Jackets to a 16–13 upset victory against the Florida State Seminoles at Doak Campbell Stadium. Sims completed 24 of 35 passes for 277 passing yards and accumulated 64 rushing yards. With the game, Sims became the first true freshman quarterback to play in a season opener for the Yellow Jackets since Reggie Ball in 2003 and the first to win a season opener. For his performance, Sims was named Atlantic Coast Conference (ACC) rookie of the week and 247Sports.com's true freshman of the week, and was recognized in weekly lists put out by the Davey O'Brien Award and the Manning Award. Following this debut, the Yellow Jackets suffered two defeats, losing 49–21 to the UCF Knights and 37–20 to the Syracuse Orange. In the latter game, Sims threw four interceptions.

Sims showed some improvement in his sophomore campaign, throwing for 1,468 yards, 12 touchdowns, and 7 interceptions - along with 372 rushing yards and 4 touchdowns in 5 starts. However, he shared the role of starting quarterback with freshman Jordan Yates, as the Yellow Jackets finished with a 3-9 record and once again missed out on bowl eligibility. On November 27, 2022, Sims announced his decision to enter the transfer portal.

Nebraska
On December 18, 2022, Sims announced his commitment to Nebraska Cornhuskers.

Statistics

See also 
 List of Georgia Tech Yellow Jackets starting quarterbacks

References

External links 
 

American football quarterbacks
Georgia Tech Yellow Jackets football players
Living people
Players of American football from Jacksonville, Florida
2002 births